Pumpkin 3D is an animation studio based in France that specializes in Computer animation.  Past work has included animation for the anime television series Oban Star-Racers and animated feature films, including Azur et Asmar and  Persepolis.

References

Information technology companies of France
French animation studios